Seong Changyeong (1930–2013) was a modern South Korean poet.

Life
Seong Changyeong was born on March 1, 1930 in Yesan County, South Chungcheong Province, Korea. He attended Seoul National University where he earned a B.A. in English. He worked as a member of the 1960s literary club Sahwajip (along with Pak Hui-jin, Pak Jaesam, Pak Seongryong, Yi Seonggyo, Yi Changdae, and Kang Wiseok,) and the poetry reading club Kionggan. Seong worked as a professor of English at Sungkyunkwan University.

Seong died on February 26, 2013.

Career
Seong Changyeong debuted with the poem “Miyeol” in the literary magazine Arts and Literature (Munhak yesul) in 1956, going on to publish "Amudo nareul”, "Monologue of Da Vinci" (Davinchiui dokbaek) and "Midwife Grandmother" (Samsin Halmeoni). Seong's first collection of poetry was titled A Fugue for Burning (Hwahyeong dunjugok, 1966); he also published Ode to Insects (Beollesorisong, 1970), Song for Time (Siganeum, 1982), The Eyes of the Soul and the Eyes of the Body (Yeonghonui Nun Yukcheui Nun, 1986), The Enchanted Green (Hwangholhan Cholokbitt, 1989), and A Tribute to the Pine Tree (Sonamureul Girim, 1991).

Of Seong Changyeong's poetry, the Korea Literature Translation Institute writes:
Sung Chan-gyeong is a modernist poet in the truest sense of the word. A master of metaphor, his poems are full of modernist experimentation in both technical form and content. His influences are generally understood to include the British romanticist poet D.M. Thomas as well as the poets of metaphysical school.Sung’s poems, generally involving abstract themes and ideas like much Korean poetry from the 50s an 60s, heavily employ the tool of the metaphor. In his famous poem “The Screw Bolt” (Nasa), the poet, according to one critic, employs the stray screw bolt as a metaphor for a lost soul, or a relic of civilization which, like a 'word out of context', must be reconciled with some sort of an organic order. These metaphors, so crucial to Sung’s poetry, go beyond the standard of a way of comparison, and comprise his fundamental orientation, as is expressed in his poem "I Love Metaphors" (Eunyureul saranghanda).Because of just this writing style, in addition to the rapid progress and buildup of language and the use of largely unfamiliar images, Sung’s poetry is often considered to be difficult to understand. However, Sung’s unique expression of language is not in the least impossible to appreciate and does not necessarily have to be avoided: his bold use of scientific terms such as 'ion', 'electronics', 'aurora’, etc. and his use of old Korean, English words, and Korean-Chinese hybrid words can be quite surprising and intriguing, and, above all, guarantees complete originality.Seong's best-known work in Korean is a series of poems entitled The Screw Bolt, in which he tried to find nature in the artifacts of civilization.

Works

Works in Korean (partial)

Poetry collections
 A Fugue for Burning (Hwahyeong dunjugok, 1966)
 Ode to Insects (Beollesorisong, 1970)
 Song for Time (Siganeum, 1982)
 The Eyes of the Soul and the Eyes of the Body (Yeonghonui Nun Yukcheui Nun, 1986)
 The Enchanted Green (Hwangholhan Cholokbitt, 1989)
 A Tribute to the Pine Tree (Sonamureul Girim)

Awards
 1st 'Korean Poets Association Awards' - for "The Screw Bolt" (Nasa) in 1979
 5th 'Contemporary Poetics Awards' - for “Half-Translucent” (Ban Tumyeong) in 1985
 2nd 'Literature of Light and Save' in 1991

References 

1930 births
2013 deaths
South Korean male poets
20th-century South Korean poets
International Writing Program alumni
Society of Korean Poets Award winners
20th-century male writers